Panchayat samiti is a rural local government (panchayat) body at the intermediate tehsil (taluka/mandal) level in India. It works for the villages of the tehsil that together are called a development block. It has been said to be the "panchayat of panchayats".

The 73rd Amendment defines the levels of panchayati raj institution as :

 No Level
 Intermediate level
 Base level

The panchayat samiti is the link between the gram panchayat (village council) and the zila parishad (district board). The name varies across states: mandal parishad in Andhra Pradesh, taluka panchayat in Gujarat, and mandal panchayat in Karnataka.

Composition 
Typically, a taluka panchayat is composed of elected members of the area: the block development officer, members of the state's legislative assembly, members of parliament belonging to that area, otherwise unrepresented groups (Scheduled Castes, Scheduled Tribes and women), associate members (such as a farmer, a representative of the cooperative societies and one from the agricultural marketing services sector) and the elected members of that panchayat block (tehsil) on the zila parishad (district board).

The samiti is elected for five years and is headed by a chairman and deputy chairman elected by the members of the panchayat samiti. One sarpanch samiti supervises the other grampanchayats. It acts as a co-ordinating body between district panchayat and grampanchayat.

Composition of mandal parishads 
A coterminous mandal parishad is constituted for each revenue mandal. A mandal parishad is composed of:
 Mandal parishad territorial constituency members.
 Members of the state legislative assembly having jurisdiction over the mandal.
 Members of the House of the People having jurisdiction over the mandal.
 Members of the Council of States who are voters in the mandal.
 One co-opted member, belonging to minorities.
Mandal parishad territorial constituency (MPTC) members are directly elected by the voters, whereas the mandal president is elected by the MPTC members. The members are elected for a term of five years. The election to MPTCs is done on a party basis. The elections are conducted by the state election commission.

The sarpanch are permanent invitees to the mandal parishad meetings.

Departments 
The most common departments found in a panchayat samiti are:

 Administration
 Finance
 Public works (especially water and roads)
 Agriculture
 Health
 Education teacher list
 Social welfare
 Information technology
 Women & child development
 Panchayat raj (mandal praja parishad)

Each department in a panchayat samiti has its own officer. Most often these are state government employees acting as extension officers, but occasionally in more revenue-rich panchayat samiti, they may be local employees. A government-appointed block development officer (BDO) is the supervisor of the extension officers and executive officer to the panchayat samiti and becomes, in effect, its administrative chief.

Functions 
The panchayat samiti collects all the prospective plans prepared at Gram Panchayat level and process them for funding and implementation by evaluating them from the angles of financial constraints, social welfare, and area development. It also identifies and prioritizes the issues that should be addressed at the block level.

Sources of income 
The income of the panchayat samiti comes from:
 land and water use taxes, professional taxes, liquor taxes and others
 income-generating programmes
 grants-in-aid and loans from the state government and the local zila parishad
 voluntary contributions

For many panchayat samiti, the main source of income is state aid. For others, the traditional taxing function provides the bulk of revenues. Tax revenues are often shared between the gram panchayats and the panchayat samiti.

References 

Panchayati raj (India)